Rahul Rajasekharan Nair is an Indian model, actor and the winner of Mister Supranational India 2021 beauty pageant title. He represented India at Mister Supranational 2021 held on 22 August 2021 at Nowy Sącz, Poland and made it to the Top 10 finalists and also bagged the Mister Supranational Asia 2021 title.

Early life and career 
Rahul was born and raised up in Bangalore, Karnataka to Malayali parents hailing from Kottayam, Kerala. After earning his Bachelor of Business Administration degree from Christ University, Rahul worked in the corporate industries for two years before shifting his focus to his passion for modeling and acting.

Rahul made his successful debut in the Malayalam film industry with Diwanjimoola Grand Prix (2018), followed by Varane Avashyamund (2020). Both films were declared box office successes and were well received by the film fraternity.

Pageantry

Mister India 2015 
In 2015, Rahul participated at the 7th edition of Mister India competition held on 23 July 2015 at Club Royalty, Mumbai, Maharashtra where he ended up as 1st Runner-up to Rohit Khandelwal, who later became the first Indian to win the Mister World title. During the competition, Rahul also won the Best Actor and Mister Ironman sub-titles.

Mister Supranational India 2021 
In June 2021, Rahul was shortlisted to Top 12 contestants for the Mister Supranational India 2021 title amongst thousands of registrations. Due to the pandemic situation that has paralyzed the country, the entire competition followed the digital course, virtual projection and online interviews. On 8 June 2021, former Mister Supranational India 2019, Varun Verma, announced Rahul as the titleholder of Mister Supranational India 2021 via a video presentation on social media platforms.

Mister Supranational 2021 
As the winner of Mister Supranational India 2021, Rahul represented India at Mister Supranational 2021 pageant held at Nowy Sącz, Poland on 22 August 2021 where at the end of the event, Nate Crnkovich of United States crowned Varo Vargas of Peru as his successor. Rahul's placement made India's fifth-year streak of placing in the top 10 finalists in Mister Supranational pageant.

Films

Television

References

External links
 

Living people
Malayali people
Mister World
Indian male models
Indian male television actors
Male actors from Kerala
Indian beauty pageant winners
Beauty pageant contestants from India
Male beauty pageant winners
Year of birth missing (living people)